Dominic James Leech (born 10 January 2001) is an English cricketer. He made his first-class debut on 8 August 2020, for Yorkshire in the 2020 Bob Willis Trophy. He made his Twenty20 debut on 10 June 2022, for Yorkshire in the 2022 T20 Blast.

References

External links
 

2001 births
Living people
English cricketers
Yorkshire cricketers
Cricketers from Middlesbrough